Szolcsva is the Hungarian name for two places in Romania:

 Sălciua Commune, Alba County
 Sălciva village, Zam Commune, Hunedoara County